Ivan Cooper (28 January 1896 – 2 August 1968) was a New Zealand cricketer. He played thirteen first-class matches for Auckland between 1925 and 1928.

Cooper was a batsman and occasional leg-spin bowler. His best performance in the Plunket Shield came against Canterbury in the 1927–28 season, when he scored 40 and 80 (the highest score on either side) and took a wicket. He was twelfth man for New Zealand in the unofficial Test in Auckland against Australia a few weeks later, but played no first-class cricket after that.

See also
 List of Auckland representative cricketers

References

External links
 

1896 births
1968 deaths
New Zealand cricketers
Auckland cricketers
Cricketers from Auckland